Events from the 1140s in England.

Incumbents
Monarch – Stephen (to 8 April 1141), Matilda (8 April to 1 November 1141), then Stephen

Events
 1140
 December – The Anarchy: Earl Ranulf of Chester captures Lincoln.
 Dryburgh Abbey founded.
 1141
 2 February – The Anarchy: At the First Battle of Lincoln, Robert, 1st Earl of Gloucester and Empress Matilda wrest control of the throne from King Stephen, who is captured and imprisoned.
 8 April – The Anarchy: Matilda is proclaimed "Lady of the English".
 24 June – The Anarchy: Matilda is forced to flee Westminster during a royal banquet, and flees to Oxford.
 July – The Anarchy: Matilda I of Boulogne, wife of Stephen, recaptures London.
 14 September – The Anarchy: Rout of Winchester: Robert of Gloucester captured by forces loyal to Stephen during fighting at Winchester.
 1 November – The Anarchy: Stephen and Robert exchanged as prisoners ending the reign of Matilda.
 1142
 Matilda grants the church of Oakley, Buckinghamshire, with its chapels of Brill, Boarstall and Addingrove, to the monks of the Priory of St Frideswide, Oxford.
 Matilda's son Henry comes to England for the first time.
 In 1142, a group of Anglo-Norman independent crusaders led by William and Ralph Vitalus helped King Afonso I Henriques of Portugal on a failed Siege of Lisbon (1142) before continuing on their way to the Holy Land.
 26 September – The Anarchy: Stephen captures Oxford, and besieges Matilda inside the castle.
 December – The Anarchy: Matilda escapes from Oxford Castle across the snow in a white cape for camouflage, according to Henry of Huntingdon.
 1143
 1 July – The Anarchy: Battle of Wilton – Robert, 1st Earl of Gloucester, defeats Stephen at Wilton.
 The Anarchy: Geoffrey de Mandeville, a supporter of Matilda, is deprived of his castles in Essex, but subsequently captures Ely and campaigns in Cambridgeshire.
 Robert of Ketton makes the first European translation of the Qur'an into Latin.
 1144 
 11 February – Robert of Chester completes the translation of Book of the Composition of Alchemy from Arabic to Latin. It is the first book in Europe to describe alchemy.
 22 March – A young apprentice, William of Norwich, is murdered, a crime attributed to the Jews by the Norwich mob, the first known medieval accusation of blood libel against Jews.
 28 November–24 December – the Siege of Edessa by Muslims led by Imad ad-Din Zengi eliminates the Crusader principality of Outremer, the news causing the pope to preach a new Crusade.
 Matilda's husband Geoffrey V of Anjou, completes the conquest of Normandy.
 1145
 The Anarchy: Stephen captures Faringdon Castle.
 Woburn Abbey founded.
 Robert of Chester makes the first translation of an algebra text from Arabic into Latin.
 1146
 The Anarchy: Ranulf of Chester is captured, but released after surrendering his castles.
 Many knights and barons leave England to take part in the Second Crusade.
 1147
 The Anarchy: Henry arrives in England to fight for Matilda, but is defeated in skirmishes, and returns to Normandy.
 The Anarchy: Ranulf of Chester lays waste to the land around Coventry, but fails to capture the city itself.
 Late Spring – An expedition of Crusaders leaves from Dartmouth, Devon, for the Second Crusade to the Holy Land, Englishmen together with forces from Flanders, Frisia, Scotland and some German polities. Leadership is provided by Hervey de Glanvill, a Norman nobleman and constable of Suffolk, who leads a fleet of some 200 ships. Bad weather forces them to take refuge at the mouth of the Douro in Portugal on 16 June.
 24 October – English crusaders capture Lisbon from the Moors.
 1148
 February – The Anarchy: Empress Matilda forced to return to Normandy.
 1149
 22 May – King David I of Scotland knights Henry, and cedes northern Lancashire to Ranulf of Chester, in return for control of Carlisle.
 King David I of Scotland attempts to wrest control of the Bishopric of Durham and the Archbishopric of York from Stephen, but fails.

Births
 1140
William FitzRalph, future Sheriff of Nottingham and seneschal of Normandy
 1146
William Marshal, 1st Earl of Pembroke, soldier and statesman (died 1219)
 1147
Hugh de Kevelioc, 3rd Earl of Chester (died 1181)

Deaths
 1140
 6 February – Thurstan, Archbishop of York (born c. 1070 in Normandy)
 1141
Aubrey de Vere, Lord Great Chamberlain (born 1062)
 1142
Orderic Vitalis, chronicler (born 1075)
 1143
William of Malmesbury, historian (born 1080)
 1144
Geoffrey de Mandeville, 1st Earl of Essex
 1147
 31 October – Robert, 1st Earl of Gloucester, politician (born c. 1090)
 1148
 3 January – Anselm of St Saba, abbot of Bury St Edmunds (born 1136 in Italy)
 6 January – William de Warenne, 3rd Earl of Surrey (born 1119; killed on crusade)
 30 January (approximate date) – Serlo (abbot of Cirencester)
 Gilbert de Clare, 1st Earl of Pembroke (born c. 1100)

References